Amata aperta  is a species of moth of the family Erebidae first described by Francis Walker in 1865. It is found in Australia  (Queensland, New South Wales and Victoria) and New Guinea.

References 

aperta
Moths described in 1865
Moths of Australia
Moths of New Guinea